Kashipur (also spelt Cossipur, Kashipur) is a neighbourhood of North Kolkata, in Kolkata district in the Indian state of West Bengal. One of the oldest neighbourhoods of the metropolis, it has a police station.

History
The East India Company obtained from the Mughal emperor Farrukhsiyar, in 1717, the right to rent from 38 villages surrounding their settlement. Of these 5 lay across the Hooghly in what is now Howrah district. The remaining 33 villages were on the Calcutta side. After the fall of Siraj-ud-daulah, the last independent Nawab of Bengal, it purchased these villages in 1758 from Mir Jafar and reorganised them. These villages were known en-bloc as Dihi Panchannagram and Cossipore was one of them. It was considered to be a suburb beyond the limits of the Maratha Ditch.

H. E. A. Cotton writes, "The Cossipore Reach was one of the finest on the river, and is lined by a number of villa residences." From those days Cossipore had a number of industrial units. – the Government Gun Foundry, the Snider and Rifle Shell factories (originally constructed by Colonel Hutchinson), sugar mills and jute screw houses.

Entally, Manicktala, Beliaghata, Ultadanga, Chitpur, Cossipore, parts of Beniapukur, Ballygunge, Watgunge and Ekbalpur and parts of Garden Reach and Tollygunj were added to Kolkata Municipal Corporation in 1888. Garden Reach was later taken out.

Geography

KMC ward
Ward No. 1 and Ward No. 6 of Kolkata Municipal Corporation cover Cossipore. It has six prominent ghats on the Hooghly – from south - Cossipore Ghat, Sadhur Ghat, Ranir Ghat, Pramanick Ghat, Ramakrishna Mahasashan and Ratan Babu Ghat.

Police district
Cossipore police station is part of the North and North Suburban division of Kolkata Police. Located at 58/A, Barrackpore Trunk Road, Kolkata-700002, it has jurisdiction over Cossipore neighbourhood/ Ward No. 1 of Kolkata Municipal Corporation.

Amherst Street Women police station covers all police districts under the jurisdiction of the North and North Suburban division i.e. Amherst Street, Jorabagan, Shyampukur, Cossipore, Chitpur, Sinthi, Burtolla and Tala.

Transport
Cossipore Road (Sri Sri Ramakrishna Paramahansa Dev Sarani) is the artery of the area. The road is connected to B.T. Road (at Chiria More) with Khagendra Chatterjee Road.

Bus

Private Bus
 34B Dunlop - Esplanade
 43 Dakshineswar - Esplanade
 242 Cossipore 4B - Esplanade

CSTC Bus
 S17A Ariadaha - Kudghat

Train
Kolkata Station (one of the major railway hub stations of the city) and Dum Dum Junction are the nearest railway stations. Tala railway station and Bagbazar railway station on Kolkata Circular Railway line are also located nearby.

Cossipore Electric Generating Station

New Cossipore Generating station started producing electric for CESC from the year 1949 and has current capacity of 100 MW. This is older and uses non Pulverized Fuel to generate electricity. This unit plays a major part creating an economic eco system in its own. There are a lot of people live in Cossipore who are part of that ecosystem. But in 2015 it was closed.

Gallery

External links

References

Neighbourhoods in Kolkata